Per Nielsen (born 1 June 1954) is a popular Danish trumpet player.

Nielsen has released several albums that have sold around 400,000 copies, including three albums that have been certified platinum and nine albums certified as gold. His debut release on 23 May 1987, called Trumpet Concertos, has been re-released several times.

Nielsen was born in Sønderborg. In addition to his solo career and his tours, he has been a member and main trumpeter of Sønderjyllands Symfoniorkester (the South Jutland Symphony Orchestra).

Discography

Albums

References

External links
Trompet.com Official per Nielsen website

Danish musicians
1954 births
Living people
People from Sønderborg Municipality
20th-century Danish musicians
21st-century Danish musicians